Joshua Seixas Arantes do Nascimento (born 28 September 1996) is a Brazilian former footballer who played as a forward.

Early and personal life
Nascimento was born to Brazilian gospel singer Assiria Seixas Lemos and Brazilian football legend Pelé. He has a twin sister, named Celeste. In August 2020, his mother took Pelé to court, claiming child support that had been owed since March of the same year.

Footballing career

Early career
At the age of ten, he trained with Santos, the club where his father made his name, for the first time. He moved to the United States at the age of twelve, and joined the academy side Florida Rush three years later.

He returned to Brazil in 2013, joining Santos on a permanent deal. While at Santos, he refused to wear his father's famous number 10 shirt, and attempted to ignore comparisons between himself and his father, stating "he was him and I am me." He made his debut for the Santos under-20 side in October 2014.

Collegiate soccer
Having suffered numerous injuries while at Santos, Nascimento returned to the United States to enrol at the University of Tampa in 2015. However, his time in Tampa was also marred by injury, and he was redshirted in his first season with the university's soccer team, the Tampa Spartans. He made one appearance in 2016, but this would be his only playing time until his graduation in 2018.

Later life
Having been raised mostly in the United States, he decided to remain there following his decision not to pursue a career in professional football, and he was named as a representative for Santos in North America in 2020. He joined the SIMA Pre-Academy, a soccer academy for children, in 2021. He has also worked as a fitness instructor and soccer coach in soccer academies across Orlando, as well as completing an internship in the Santos academy physiology department.

Having graduated university with a Bachelor of Science in human performance and exercise physiology, Nascimento had an internship with Belgian football team Royale Union Saint-Gilloise in March 2022, in the hope of working as a physical trainer.

He currently works as a physical trainer at the Soccer Institute of the Montverde Academy.

References

1996 births
Living people
Footballers from São Paulo
University of Tampa alumni
Brazilian footballers
Association football forwards
Santos FC players
Tampa Spartans men's soccer players
Brazilian expatriate footballers
Brazilian expatriate sportspeople in the United States
Expatriate soccer players in the United States